Sam Irwin (born 25 October 1992) is an Australian professional rugby league footballer who last played for Featherstone Rovers in the Kingstone Press Championship.

Background
Born in Darwin, Northern Territory, Irwin played his junior rugby league for the Nightcliff Dragons in the Darwin Rugby League competition before being signed by the Burleigh Bears in the Queensland Cup in 2010.

Playing career
In 2011, Irwin joined the Gold Coast Titans. He played for the Titans' NYC team in 2011 and 2012.

In Round 6 of the 2013 NRL season, Irwin made his NRL début for the Titans against the Parramatta Eels.

On 11 September 2014, Irwin signed a 2-year contract with the Featherstone Rovers starting in 2015.

References

External links
2014 Gold Coast Titans profile

1992 births
Living people
Australian rugby league players
Burleigh Bears players
Featherstone Rovers players
Gold Coast Titans players
Rugby league halfbacks
Rugby league hookers
Rugby league players from Darwin, Northern Territory
Tweed Heads Seagulls players